The Swallows of Kabul is a 2019 internationally co-produced adult animated psychological drama film directed by Zabou Breitman and Eléa Gobé Mévellec. It was screened in the Un Certain Regard section at the 2019 Cannes Film Festival. The film is an adaption of the novel of the same name by Yasmina Khadra.

Cast
 Hiam Abbass as Mussarat
 Zita Hanrot as Zunaira
 Swann Arlaud as Mohsen
 Simon Abkarian as Atiq

Reception
After being screened at the Annecy International Animated Film Festival, OneOfUs.net called it a "great piece of animation and a very interesting character study that constantly keeps you emotionally invested and guessing as to what is going to happen next".

Accolades

References

External links
 

2019 films
2010s French animated films
2010s psychological drama films
2010s French-language films
French psychological drama films
Films directed by Zabou Breitman
2019 animated films
French adult animated films